Rodrigo Hasbún (born 1981) is a Bolivian writer. He was born in Cochabamba. He has published a collection of short stories and two novels till date; his second novel Los Afectos (Affections) has been translated in 10 languages. In 2017, Hasbun was included in the Bogotá 39 list of the most promising young writers in Latin America.

References

Living people
Bolivian writers
1981 births